Girl Asleep may refer to:

 Girl Asleep (film), a 2015 Australian drama film
 A Girl Asleep, a 1657 painting by Johannes Vermeer